The 1st CARIFTA Games was held in Bridgetown, Barbados on April 1–4, 1972.  An appraisal of the results has been given on the occasion of 40th anniversary of the games.

Participation (unofficial)

Detailed result lists can be found on the "World Junior Athletics History" website.  There is almost no information on athletes competing in the relay teams. An unofficial count (without relay teams) yields the number of about 67 athletes from about 11 countries: Barbados (12), Bermuda (5), Grenada (6), Guadeloupe (1), Guyana (8), Jamaica (20), Lesser Antilles (1 relay team), Saint Christopher-Nevis-Anguilla (3 relay teams), Saint Lucia (3 relay teams), Saint Vincent and the Grenadines (1 + 3 relay teams), Trinidad and Tobago (14).

Medal summary
Medal winners are published by category: Boys under 20 (Junior), and Girls under 20 (Junior).   
Complete results can be found on the "World Junior Athletics History" website.

Boys under 20 (Junior)

Girls under 20 (Junior)

Medal table (unofficial)

References

External links
World Junior Athletics History

CARIFTA Games
International athletics competitions hosted by Barbados
1972 in Barbados
CARIFTA
1972 in Caribbean sport